Cathaoirleach (Irish for chairperson;) is the title of the chair (or presiding officer) of Seanad Éireann, the sixty-member upper house of the Oireachtas, the legislature of Ireland. The current Cathaoirleach, who has held the office since 16 December 2022, is Fine Gael Senator Jerry Buttimer.

Powers and functions
The Cathaoirleach is the sole judge of order, and has a range of powers and functions, namely:

Calls on members to speak and all speeches must be addressed to the Chair.
Puts such questions to the House as are required, supervises Divisions and declares the results.
Has authority to suppress disorder, to enforce prompt obedience to Rulings and may order members to withdraw from the House or name them for suspension by the House itself for a period.
In the case of great disorder can suspend or adjourn the House.

The Cathaoirleach is also an  member of the Council of State, which advises the president of Ireland in the exercise of their discretionary powers, and of the Presidential Commission, which performs the powers and functions of the office of president in their absence.

List of office-holders

Cathaoirleach
This list includes the panel (since 1938) and political affiliation of each Cathaoirleach, as well as the number of the Seanad and time they spent in the position.

Leas-Chathaoirleach

See also
Ceann Comhairle (Chairperson of Dáil Éireann)
Politics of the Republic of Ireland
History of the Republic of Ireland
Seanad Éireann (Irish Free State)
Leader of the Seanad

References

External links

 
Lists of members of Seanad Éireann
Titles of national or ethnic leadership
Seanad Éireann
Ireland
Lists of legislative speakers
1922 establishments in Ireland